State Road 267 in the U.S. state of Indiana is a north–south route connecting Interstate 65 in Boone County to Interstate 74 in Brownsburg. It passes through the town of Brownsburg in the counties of Boone, and Hendricks.

Route description 
SR 267 is a relatively short route that has been truncated several times over the past years. It begins at Interstate 74 in Brownsburg and heads north towards its northern terminus at I-65 in Boone County. Parts of the route are slated to become part of the Ronald Reagan Parkway extension northward in the future.

History 
Between 1917 and 1926 SR 267 was an unsigned route. The highway's length has been truncated multiple times over the past years. The southern terminus at one point was at State Road 37, following the route of State Road 144. In the 1960s SR 267 was moved to a new route east of the old route, between I-70 and US 40, allowing access to the interstate via a new interchange. In the winter of 2013, the route between US 40 and I-74 was removed and given to the county, splitting the route in two. In early 2017, INDOT gave the route between SR 42 and Center Street to Hendricks County. On April 1, 2021, the remaining section south of US 40 was given over to the town of Plainfield, as well as Hendricks County, leaving SR 267 to only run between I-74 and I-65.

Construction projects
 A $17.5 million Major Moves reconstruction project began in May 2006 on SR 267 between I-70 and US 40 in Plainfield.  It was completed in late summer 2007. 37-year-old concrete was replaced, with added turn lanes and a new dedicated intersection for Metropolis Mall Parkway to enhance traffic flow.
 A $3.2 million Major Moves reconstruction project began in 2008 in Brownsburg north of I-74.

Major intersections

See also
 State Road 67
 State Road 167

References

External links

267
Transportation in Boone County, Indiana
Transportation in Hendricks County, Indiana
Transportation in Morgan County, Indiana